Shir Rud or Shirrud or Shirud may refer to:
 Bala Shir Rud
 Pain Shirud